Tmesisternini is a tribe of beetles in the subfamily Lamiinae containing the following genera:

 Arrhenotoides Breuning, 1945
 Blapsilon Pascoe, 1860
 Buprestomorpha Thomson, 1860
 Epiblapsilon Gressitt, 1984
 Falsapolia Breuning, 1945
 Pascoea White, 1855
 Sepicana Kriesche, 1923
 Sphingnotus Perroud, 1855
 Sulawesiella Weigel & Withaar, 2006
 Temnosternopsis Breuning, 1939
 Temnosternus White, 1855
 Tmesisternopsis Breuning, 1945
 Tmesisternus Latreille, 1829
 Trigonoptera Perroud, 1855

References

 
Lamiinae